Gobio obtusirostris is a species of gudgeon, a small freshwater in the family Cyprinidae. It is found in the middle and upper reaches of the Danube River drainages.

References

 

Gobio
Fish described in 1842
Taxa named by Achille Valenciennes
Freshwater fish of Europe